Kalinga, officially the Province of Kalinga, is a landlocked province in the Philippines situated within the Cordillera Administrative Region in Luzon. Its capital is Tabuk and borders Mountain Province to the south, Abra to the west, Isabela to the east, Cagayan to the northeast, and Apayao to the north. Kalinga and Apayao are the result of the 1995 partitioning of the former province of Kalinga-Apayao which was seen to better service the respective needs of the various indigenous peoples in the area.

Unbeknownst to many, President Emilio Aguinaldo proclaimed Lubuagan town the seat of government for 73 days from March 6, 1900, to May 18, 1900, before finally fleeing to Palanan.

History
Kalinga was taken from Cagayan and Isabela provinces and established by the Americans through Philippine Commission Act No. 1642 on May 9, 1907, as a sub-province of Lepanto-Bontoc.

Kalinga was later organized as one of the sub-provinces of Mountain Province, created by Act No. 1876.

In the early years, the subprovince underwent series of territorial changes. Part of Kalinga was transferred to another sub-province Bontoc through Executive Order No. 53 in 1914. In the municipal district of Pinukpuk, barrios were moved to Balbalan in 1926; as well as parts of it to Conner in Apayao in 1927.

Kalinga was became part of a province along with Apayao when the old Mountain Province was divided into four separate provinces through Republic Act No. 4695 in 1966 and, with Abra, became part of the territories in the Cordillera Administrative Region which was created through Executive Order No. 220 in 1987. Kalinga was converted into a province in 1995 by virtue of RA No. 7878 when majority of the voters in Kalinga-Apayao approved in a plebiscite the division of the province into two.

Contemporary history
On February 15, 2023, the province was certified by Guinness World Records with two titles: largest gong ensemble (in its second attempt) with 3,440 male participants, and largest banga (clay pot) dance with 4,681 female participants; both performed in a program called "Awong Chi Gangsa, Agtu'n Chi Banga" (A call of a thousand gongs, the dance of a thousand pots) in Tabuk, as part of the 4th Bodong Festival coinciding with the province's 28th founding anniversary.

Etymology
The province's name is derived from the Ibanag and Gaddang noun "kalinga", which means "enemy", "fighter", or "headtaker".

Geography

Kalinga covers a total area of  occupying the central section of the Cordillera Administrative Region in Luzon. The province is bordered by Mountain Province to the south, Abra to the west, Isabela to the east, Cagayan to the northeast, and Apayao to the north.

Large swaths of the province's lowlands are open grassland suitable for pasture, while the highlands have extensive areas of tropical rainforest. In higher elevations to the west, particularly in the mountains of Balbalan, lie some of the most intact pine forests of Luzon island. Rizal and Tabuk with their flatlands are the biggest rice producers. Next in rice production are the mountainous area, and of note are the rice terraces of Balbalan, Lubuagan, Pasil, Pinukpuk, Tinglayan, and Tanudan.

Climate

Hydrology

The province is drained mainly by the Chico River, with its headwaters in the Mountain Province and emptying into the Cagayan River. The Chico River has several tributaries: Bunog River in Tinglayan in the south; the Tanudan and Biga Rivers in the east; Pasil River in the central area; and Poswoy, Dao-angan, Mabaca and Saltan Rivers in the west.

Several small lakes can also be found in Kalinga.

Administrative divisions

Kalinga comprises one component city and seven municipalities, all encompassed by a single legislative district.

Tabuk was proclaimed a component city in 2007, but in November 2008 the Supreme Court of the Philippines ruled that its cityhood was unconstitutional. However, Tabuk had its city status reinstated by the Supreme Court on December 22, 2009.

Barangays
The seven municipalities and one component city of the province comprise 152 barangays, with Bulanao in Tabuk City as the most populous in 2010, and Anggacan Sur in Tanudan as the least. If the City of Tabuk is excluded, Pinukpuk Junction in Pinukpuk municipality has the highest population.

Demographics

On the 2000 census survey, Kalinga people comprised  of the total provincial population of 173,638.

The primary language spoken is Kalinga, including its dialects of Balangao, Butbut, Limos, Lower Tanudan, Lubuagan, Mabaka, Madukayang, Southern Kalingan, and Upper Tanudan. Gaddang, as well as Ilocano, Tagalog, and English are also spoken in as lingua francas with varying degrees of proficiency.

Economy

Culture

There are many sub-tribes in the province. The strong sense of tribal membership and filial loyalty results in frequent tribal unrest and occasional outright war. Due to the mountainous terrain and warrior-culture of the people, the Kalinga were able to preserve their culture despite centuries of occupation in the lowlands by the Spaniards, Americans, and the Japanese.

On February 22, 2019, the Department of Tourism announced the bid of Digdiga Ni Tupayya, a Kalinga courtship dance, to be included in the UNESCO Intangible Cultural Heritage Lists.

Historic figures
Macli-ing Dulag - a Kalinga warrior and leader (pangat) who opposed the Chico River Dam Project. Murdered by military personnel under the command of dictator Ferdinand Marcos. Dulag's death is remembered as one of the two occasions for the declaration of Cordillera Day in the entire Cordillera Administrative Region. His name has been inscribed in the heroes' marker in Quezon City.
Conrado Balweg - a former Filipino Catholic priest and rebel who was the founder of the Cordillera People's Liberation Army, a militant group which advocated autonomy for the Cordillera region in the Philippines. He was also known by the nom-de-guerre Ka Ambo.
Whang-od - a Kalinga master tattooist (mambabatok) and recipient of the prestigious Dangal ng Haraya Award.
Alonzo Saclag - Awarded as a National Living Treasure for his efforts to preserve the culture of Kalinga through performing arts.

References

External links

 
 

 
Provinces of the Philippines
Provinces of the Cordillera Administrative Region
States and territories established in 1995
1995 establishments in the Philippines
Former sub-provinces of the Philippines